This page lists Japan-related articles with romanized titles beginning with the letter O. For names of people, please list by surname (i.e., "Tarō Yamada" should be listed under "Y", not "T"). Please also ignore particles (e.g. "a", "an", "the") when listing articles (i.e., "A City with No People" should be listed under "City").

Oa
Oasa, Hiroshima

Ob
Sakae Ōba
Ōbaku (school of Buddhism)
Obama, Fukui
Obanazawa, Yamagata
Obara, Aichi
Obata, Mie
Obatake, Yamaguchi
Obi (sash)
Obihiro, Hokkaidō
Obu, Aichi
Keizo Obuchi

Oc
Occupied Japan
Ochanomizu Station
Ochazuke
Ochi District, Ehime
Ōchi District, Shimane
Ochi, Kōchi
Ochi, Shimane
Ochiai, Okayama

Od
Oda Chikazane
Oda clan
Oda District, Okayama
Eiichiro Oda
Oda Nagamasu
Oda Nobuhide
Oda Nobunaga
Oda Nobuyuki
Oda Sakunosuke
Oda, Ehime
Ōda, Shimane
Joe Odagiri
Odai, Mie
Odaiba
Odakyu Electric Railway
Odakyu Odawara Line
Ōdate, Akita
Odawara, Kanagawa

Oe
Oe District, Tokushima
Kenzaburō Ōe
Ōe no Hiromoto
Oe, Kyoto

Of
Ōfunato, Iwate

Og
Oga, Akita
Oga Yashiro
Ōgaki, Gifu
Ogaki, Hiroshima
Ogasa District, Shizuoka
Ogasa, Shizuoka
Ogasawara Islands
Ken Ogata
Ogata Kenzan
Ogata Kōrin
Ogata, Kōchi
Ogata, Ōita
Ogawa, Kumamoto
Marumi Ogawa
Ogi District, Saga
Ogi, Ōita
Ogi, Saga
Ogimi, Okinawa
Ogori, Fukuoka
Ogori, Yamaguchi
Oguchi, Aichi
Oguni, Kumamoto
Oguri Mushitaro

Oh
Oh My Goddess!
Ohara District, Shimane
Ohara, Okayama
Ōharu, Aichi
Masayoshi Ohira
Naoto Ohshima
Ohito, Shizuoka
Ohka
Hideo Ohkubo

Oi
Oigawa, Shizuoka
Ōita District, Ōita
Ōita Prefecture
Ōita, Ōita

Oj
Ōji, Nara
Ojigi
Ojiya, Niigata

Ok
Kiyoshi Oka
Okabe, Shizuoka
Okachimachi Station
Keisuke Okada
Okadama Airport
Okagaki, Fukuoka
Okakura Kakuzo
Okamoto Kanoko
Okamoto Kido
Okawa, Fukuoka
Ōkawa, Kōchi
Okawachi, Hyōgo
Okaya
Okayama Prefecture
Okayama, Okayama
Okazaki, Aichi
Okazaki Castle
Okazaki fragment
Ritsuko Okazaki
Okegawa, Saitama
Oki District, Shimane
Oki Province
Oki, Fukuoka
Okimi, Hiroshima
Okinawa diet
Okinawa Prefecture
Okinawan weapons
Okinawa, Okinawa
Okinawan language
Okita Sōji
Okonomiyaki
Oku District, Okayama
Oku, Okayama
Ōkubo Toshimichi
Ōkuchi, Kagoshima
Okuchichibu Mountains
Okudaira Sadamasa
Ōkuma Shigenobu
Okutsu, Okayama

Ol
The Old Capital
Olympus Corporation
Olympus C-770 Movie
Olympus C-8080 Wide Zoom

Om
Ōmachi, Nagano
Ōmachi, Saga
Omaezaki, Shizuoka
Ōmagari, Akita
Ōme, Tokyo
Omogo, Ehime
Ōmi Province
Ōmihachiman, Shiga
Ōmishima, Ehime
Ōmishima Island, Ehime
Ōmisoka
Omiya, Mie
Ōmiya-ku, Saitama
Omoikane (Shinto)
Ōmura, Nagasaki
Ōmura Masujirō
Omuta, Fukuoka

On
On Kawara
Ondo (music)
Ondo, Hiroshima
One Piece
One Year War
Onejime, Kagoshima
Onga District, Fukuoka
Onga, Fukuoka
Oni (folklore)
Onigiri
Onigokko
Oniisama e
Ōnin War
Ōnishi, Ehime
Onix
Onmyōdō
Onna, Okinawa
Ono, Hyōgo
Ono, Fukui
Ono, Fukushima
Ono, Gifu
Ōno, Hiroshima
Ōno, Hokkaidō
Ōno, Iwate
Ōno, Ōita
Ōno District, Fukui
Ōno District, Gifu
Ōno District, Ōita
Ono no Komachi
Ōno River
Shinji Ono
Yoko Ono
Onoda, Yamaguchi
Hiroo Onoda
Onoe Saishu
Onohara, Kagawa
Ōnojō, Fukuoka
Onomi, Kōchi
Onomichi, Hiroshima
Onsen
Onsen District, Ehime
Onsen, Hyōgo

Oo
Ooka Shohei
Ōoka Tadasuke
Oomoto
Ōoku
Oozaru

Op
Operation Stardust

Or
Orient Watch
Origami
Original video animation
Orix BlueWave
Oroshi hocho
Oroshigane
Orphen

Os
Osa, Okayama
Osafune, Okayama
Osaka Aquarium Kaiyukan
Osaka Bay
Osaka Castle
Osaka Eco Agricultural Products
Osaka International Airport
Osaka Line
Osaka Loop Line
Osaka Monorail
Osaka Municipal Subway
Osaka Prefecture
Osaka school massacre
Osaka Station
Osaka, Osaka
Osaka Tower
Ōsakasayama, Osaka
Ōsaki Station
Ōsaki, Kagoshima
Ōsakikamijima, Hiroshima
Osechi
Mamoru Oshii
Shunrō Oshikawa
Oshikura Manju
Oshima, Fukuoka
Oshima, Yamaguchi
Ōshima District, Kagoshima
Ōshima District, Yamaguchi
Nagisa Oshima
Oshima Subprefecture
Towa Oshima
Oshiruko
Oshizushihako
Sakae Osugi
Osuka, Shizuoka
Osumi Province
Osumi, Kagoshima

Ot
Ōta Dōkan
Fusae Ota
Ōta, Gunma
Ōta, Ōita
Ōta, Tokyo
Masahide Ota
Ōtake, Hiroshima
Otaku
Otaku no Video
Otaru, Hokkaidō
Ōtawara, Tochigi
Oto, Fukuoka
Oto, Nara
Oto, Wakayama
Otokuni District, Kyoto
Katsuhiro Otomo
Ōtomo no Yakamochi
Otomo Yoshihide
Otoshi buta
Otowa, Aichi
Ōtoyo, Kōchi
Ōtsu, Shiga
Otsu District, Yamaguchi
Ōtsuki, Yamanashi
Ōtsuki, Kōchi

Ou
Ouchi, Saga
Ōuchiyama, Mie
Ouda, Nara
Ōura, Kagoshima
Outlaw Star

Ow
Owari Province
Owariasahi, Aichi
Owase, Mie

Ov
Overman King Gainer

Oy
Oyabe, Toyama
Oyakoba
Oyakodon
Ōyama, Ōita
Oyama, Shizuoka
Oyama, Tochigi
Ōyama Iwao
Oyama Shrine (Ishikawa)
Oyamada, Mie
Ōyamazaki, Kyoto
Oyano, Kumamoto
Ōyodo, Nara

Oz
Ozaki Koyo
Ozato, Okinawa
Ōzeki
Ōzu, Ehime
Ōzu, Kumamoto
Yasujirō Ozu

O